The Asian Young Footballer of the Year award, officially known as the AFC Youth Player of the Year award, is presented to the best young football player in Asia. It has been awarded by the Asian Football Confederation (AFC) since 1995. It is usually presented during the AFC Annual Awards in November or December.

Overall winners (1995–2007) 
{| class="wikitable"
!Year
!Player
!Nation
!Club
|-
|1995
|Mohammed Al-Kathiri
|
|
|-
|1996
|Bamrung Boonprom
|
| Bangkok Bank
|-
|1997
|Mehdi Mahdavikia
|
| Persepolis
|-
|1998
|Shinji Ono
|
| Urawa Red Diamonds
|-
|1999
|Waleed Hamzah
|
| Al-Arabi
|-
|2000
|Ryoichi Maeda
|
| Jubilo Iwata
|-
|2001
|Du Wei
|
| Shanghai Shenhua
|-
|2002
|Lee Chun-Soo
|
| Ulsan Hyundai Horang-i
|-
|2003
|Yoshito Okubo
|
| Cerezo Osaka
|-
|2004
|Park Chu-Young
|
| Korea University
|-
|2005
|Choe Myong-Ho
|
| Kyonggongop
|-
|2006
|Ma Xiaoxu
|
| Dalian Shide
|-
|2007
|Kim Kum-Il
|
| April 25
|}

Men's winners (2008–present)
{| class="wikitable"
!Year
!Player
!Nation
!Club
|-
|2008
|Ahmad Khalil
|
| Al-Ahli
|-
|2009
|Ki Sung-Yueng
|
| FC Seoul
|-
|2010
|Jong Il-Gwan
|
| Rimyongsu
|-
|2011
|Hideki Ishige
|
| Shimizu S-Pulse
|-
|2012
|Mohannad Abdul-Raheem
|
| Duhok SC
|-
|2013
|Ali Adnan Kadhim
|
| Çaykur Rizespor
|-
|2014 
|Ahmed Moein
|
| Eupen
|-
|2015
|Dostonbek Khamdamov
|
| Bunyodkor
|-
|2016
|Ritsu Dōan
|
| Gamba Osaka
|-
|2017
|Lee Seung-woo
|
| Verona
|-
|2018
|Turki Al-Ammar
|
| Al-Shabab
|-
|2019
|Lee Kang-in
|
| Valencia
|-
|2020
|align="center" colspan="3"|Cancelled due to the COVID-19 pandemic
|-
|2021
|align="center" colspan="3"|Cancelled due to the COVID-19 pandemic
|}

Women's winners (2008–present)
{| class="wikitable"
!Year
!Player
!Nation
!Club
|-
|2008
|Mana Iwabuchi
|
| Nippon TV Beleza
|-
|2009
|Mana Iwabuchi
|
| Nippon TV Beleza
|-
|2010
|Yeo Min-Ji
|
| Haman Daesan High School
|-
|2011
|Caitlin Foord
|
| Sydney FC
|-
|2012
|Hanae Shibata
|
| Urawa Red Diamonds
|-
|2013
|Jang Sel-gi
|
| Gangwon State University
|-
|2014
|Hina Sugita
|
| Fujieda Junshin High School
|-
|2015
|Rikako Kobayashi
|
| Tokiwagi Gakuen High School
|-
|2016
|Fuka Nagano
|
| Urawa Red Diamonds
|-
|2017
|Sung Hyang-sim
|
| Pyongyang City
|-
|2018
|Saori Takarada
|
| Cerezo Osaka Sakai
|-
|2019
|Jun Endo
|
| Nippon TV Beleza
|-
|2020
|align="center" colspan="3"|Cancelled due to the COVID-19 pandemic
|-
|2021
|align="center" colspan="3"|Cancelled due to the COVID-19 pandemic
|}

Wins by country

See also
 AFC Annual Awards
 Asian Footballer of the Year

References

External links
RSSSF Archive

Asian Football Confederation trophies and awards
Asian AFC Y
Footballer Y
Youth sport in Asia
Youth association football
Early career awards